Carl-Mikael Göran "Micke" Berlander (born 29 August 1995), known professionally as Gud (formerly known as Yung Gud), is a Swedish DJ, music producer and rapper best known as a member of rapper Yung Lean's Stockholm-based group Sad Boys. He began producing at the age of twelve, making psychedelic trance music, which heavily influenced his sonic palette. His production as a part of Sad Boys has been well received.

Outside of his role in Sad Boys, he has released an EP, named Beautiful, Wonderful, and a collaborative album, Foreign Exchange, with American rapper Rx Papi. Under his alternate persona/artist name, Rooster, he has released one EP, Rooster Debut. He has acted as a producer for several acts including Halsey, and has also remixed several songs for other artists such as Jacques Greene, Kacy Hill, and Tinashe. These remixes have also garnered a positive critical response from publications including Pigeons & Planes and The Fader.

Personal life
Berlander was born in Stockholm in 1995. Following his parents' divorce when he was ten, his dad and his older sister moved to a Stockholm suburb different to where he was living at the time. Berlander, as well as the other members of the Sad Boys group, have described living in Stockholm as "boring" and "miserable". While he has resided in the city for most of his life, Berlander had once lived in a small urban area called Gnesta, which he opined to be a Swedish equivalent to Kentucky: "Stupid people and alcohol problems, I don't know. It sucks of over there. It's so boring." He said that his mother "liked to spoil me." Berlander is part of a mixed race family, since his Nigerian grandfather met his grandmother, who was a Swede, in London. He said that his identity of his mixed race made him feel like he was "on this little island".

He did not do well in school, dropping out to pursue a career in music, and his father has always been mixed on this decision; he had always encouraged him to "just go to school and be a good person", saying that "You can't make music without a guitar. However, Berlander said in a 2014 interview that his dad had been getting a little more supportive and into what he had been doing so far. He also claimed in that same interview that he is sober, although, he said that he was wanting to try promethazine "because it's medicine. But the weeds and the speeds – no, not that."

Sad Boys

As Yung Gud described in how he first met Yung Lean, "My friend was fucking his friend at the moment. And she introduced him to my friend and me and basically that's how I met him. We'd drank some beer in a park and were like, "We like the same music, we should do something sometime."" The two had always thought of creating material together, but the two didn't start doing so until around October 2012 with the track "Oreomilkshake": "I think we were drunk in his basement and we made "Oreomilkshake." Then I just made some beats when I had the time." He explained how the name of Sad Boys came about: "I was going to buy some clothes at a store with Yung Sherman, and it was closed, and I got sad, and basically that's that." As for the stage name Yung Gud, Berlander came up with simply the word Gud, then decided to change it into Yung Gud to make it funnier, which he described as "a stupid decision." While he does hope to collaborate with other artists, he said in 2014 that he has been very much focused with his work for Sad Boys and his solo material. Yung Gud's production for Yung Lean's works has garnered favorable responses from critics, with some spotlighting how it complements Lean's rapping, and according to a journalist, his "lush" and "melodic" beats were a major part of the listeners' appeal towards Lean.

Yung Gud has admitted to liking Yung Lean, and that he has gotten more "secure" as a rapper as time goes on. He thinks that "He makes people feel some type of way". He disagrees with Lean's common comparison to Lil B, although he does comprehend why this comparison is made. However, he has also said that "there is always something wrong about him. It's like something wrong about the whole Sad Boys thing. People get really, really angry or really happy when they hear it. That's his main attraction. He's going to make people feel some type of way."

While touring with the Sad Boys during the popularity of Yung Lean's album Unknown Memory, Berlander began suffering from abuse from using stimulants like cocaine, as well as the benzodiazepine anxiety medication xanax as other members of the group did. This led to him not able to "recognize [himself] anymore". As a result, he decided to return to Sweden to spend time with his family.

Solo career
A Complex magazine critic made note of the lack of popularity of Yung Gud's career outside of Sad Boys, writing that "There's no reason this should be on the low, though, because the works are fire."

Yung Gud made a track called "Crushed", a song that's part of a genre he made up called "crushcore". This was "So people won't call it post-witchhouse-chill-step or dub-core with emo influences. Or they won't say, "This track is cool, but can you make it more based?" It's like, "This is crushcore. Fuck off."" On 5 June 2014, Yung Gud announced that he had finished his debut extended play the past week, and had been looking for a label to release it: "I don't want to keep people waiting anymore. I don't want to keep myself waiting." He had also stated he was thinking of naming the record either Wonderful or Beautiful. The now-titled four-track Beautiful, Wonderful was available for streaming worldwide via The Fader on 24 November 2014. The Sky Team label released it in European stores that same day, and to markets in the United States on 25 November. As Yung Gud described, "I've always wanted to make a product of some sort. So with this EP, I'm finally selling a specific sound and look to the people that have been supporting my music for the past year and a half." Beautiful, Wonderful received a positive review from Andrew Ryce of Resident Advisor, who scored the release a 3.5 out of five: "His solo tracks have a stargazing majesty to them, but the melodies are nailed down with grandiose percussion that makes it feel almost symphonic." The EP was promoted with a ten-day European tour lasting from 12–22 November.

On 22 June 2016, Vice Media's electronic music channel Thump premiered "Body Horror," Yung Gud's first original track in two years. It, according to Thump, is an "obfuscated, hazy R&B through a grab bag of blemishing distortion techniques, decorating it with light discordance and snippets of ravey synth patches for texture. Fittingly, it shares its name with a style of fiction known for its gut-churning corporeal thrills." Berlander also changed his stage name from Yung Gud to simply Gud, "a symbol of his development and growth as an artist" according to Hypetrak.

Collaborations

Yung Gud collaborated with S-Type of the LuckyMe record label for the song "Fire", which was released on The Fader on 9 February 2015 as a single off S-Type's EP SV8. "Fire" was also the opener for Astrid Anderson's FW15 show, which S-Type soundtracked for. The two talked about making a track together when they first met each other at one of the Sad Boys concerts, and Gud made some drum parts and sent them to S-Type for him to "do my thing with" two weeks later. Production credits have included rapper Deniro Farrar's single "World On My Shoulders 3.0", which premiered on 27 April 2015, "Blue Prada" by Prada Mane and additional production on "Strange Love", a track by singer Halsey off the deluxe edition of her debut album Badlands.

Remixes

In 2014, Yung Gud released two remixes of "No Excuse", a track by Canadian producer Jacques Greene. On 30 May 2014, The Fader premiered the recut that was a part of a remix extended play for Greene's three-track record Phantom Vibrate. The magazine described it as a "ecstatically pattering" rework of the song that alleviates "the jagged turns and gun shot sounds of the original to reveal its lushest sonic innards." Joe Price, writing for Complex magazine's website Pigeons & Planes, said that with this remix, Yung Gud had "proven once again that he has legs beyond what many coin as "meme rap."" Later on, Yung Gud did a much more harsh-sounding "VIP" remix of the track, which starts off alike to Yung Gud's first remix, and then it dives "into a deep chasm of rumbling bass complete with a hammering rhythm that rarely lets up", Price wrote. It was issued on 20 December, garnering 800,000 plays in eighteen days on SoundCloud. Yung Gud's "spacey and dreamy" re-edit for "2 On" by Tinashe, which came out on 6 September 2014, was reviewed by a Complex magazine critic who highlighted its "interesting drum work" and Tinashe's vocal performance fitting with the beat.

In 2015, Yung Gud released two remixes. On 28 June, Yung Gud did a remix of rapper Meek Mill's track "Monster". Constant Gardner of Pigeons & Planes made note of the re-cut's "chest-shaking" bass, a layer of "icy" synth lines and "twinkling" glockenspiel-style sounds, and also said that "This is Meek Mill taken from the streets of Philly to his throne in a sparkling Arctic ice palace, and it's awesome." Yung Gud remixed Kacy Hill's "Foreign Fields", which the re-edit  was released on 30 September as a promotional single of her debut EP Bloo. A Pigeons & Planes journalist wrote that Yung Gud's reworking turns the original song "into a grand experience", opining that it takes it into "new heights with heavier basslines and haunting production." A Stuff.co.nz critic compared his Foreign Fields remix to Katy Perry's track "Dark Horse" due to "some nature sounds and a marching band drum beat".

Artistry and influences
Berlander has described his influences of music as generally "left-field". He and his sister first listened to nu metal bands like Slipknot and Korn since he was eight or nine years old. He then got into electronic music and was producing psychedelic trance since he was twelve, which the genre has always been an influence for his works along with other styles of music involving ambient. However, he said in a 2014 interview that he didn't start listening to hip hop until a couple of years before. He first used a Sony Ericsson music application, and once he was bought an expensive computer by his mother, he started "really making shit" with the program GarageBand before moving on to Fruity Loops and other programs, and now uses Ableton Live. He has stated Lil Wayne, Young Thug, Andre 3000, Nas and Lil Ugly Mane to be his favorite rappers, and hopes to collaborate with Drake, PartyNextDoor, or FKA twigs in the future. Clams Casino has been a common comparison with Yung Gud's works, which he addressed in that, like Yung Lean's frequent juxtaposition with Lil B, "It's their only reference because everything else they listen to is straight hip hop. They don't know all the shit that I hear in Clams Casino. They don't hear what he's influenced by. For me, it's like he's just one of them all." He has explained how often he makes his music:

Discography
Albums
Foreign Exchange (with Rx Papi) (2021)
EPs
Beautiful, Wonderful (2014)
Frutta e Verdura (with Whitearmor) (2020)
Rooster Debut (as Rooster) (2022)
Singles
Body Horror (2016)
Vive La France / AAA (as Aamu Kuu) (2021)

Production credit
Yung Lean - Stranger (2017)

 02. "Red Bottom Sky" 
 03. "Skimask"
 04. "Silver Arrows" (produced with Whitearmor)
 05. "Metallic Intuition"
 06. "Push / Lost Weekend"
 08. "Drop It / Scooter" (produced with Whitearmor)
 09. "Hunting My Own Skin" (produced with Whitearmor)
 11. "Snakeskin / Bullets"
 13. "Agony" 
 14. "Yellowman" (produced with Yung Sherman)

Huncho Jack - Huncho Jack, Jack Huncho (2017)

 08. "Dubai Shit" (co-produced by Vinylz, OZ and Yung Lean)

Thaiboy Digital - Legendary Member (2019)

 02. "Nervous" 
 03. "Can't Tell" (produced with Woesum)
 04. "Kiss Me Through the Scope"
 05. "IDGAF" (produced with Whitearmor)
 07. "Kit Kat"
 08. "Lip Service" (featuring Ecco2k) 
 09. "Beijing" (produced with Whitearmor)
 10. "Spinnin" (produced with Whitearmor)
 11. "Baby (Legendary Member)" (featuring Ecco2k) (produced with Woesum and Whitearmor)

Ecco2K - E (2019)

 02. "Peroxide" 
 03. "Fragile"
 04. "Bliss Fields"
 06. "Cc" (produced with Whitearmor)
 10. "Security!" (produced with Mechatok)
 11. "Time"
 12. "Blue Eyes"

Bladee - Exeter (2020)

 01. "Mirror (Hymn) (Intro)"
 02. "Wonderland" (featuring Ecco2k)
 03. "Merry-Go-Round"
 04. "Rain3ow Star (Love Is All)"
 05. "Every Moment Special"
 06. "DNA Rain"
 07. "Open Symbols (Play) Be in Your Mind"
 08. "Lovestory" (featuring Ecco2k)
 09. "Imaginary"

References

External links
"Gud" on YEAR0001.

Musicians from Stockholm
Swedish male musicians
Swedish record producers
1995 births
Living people
Swedish people of Russian descent
Swedish people of Nigerian descent